Market houses (sometimes earlier called tholsels) are a notable feature of many Irish towns with varying styles of architecture, size and ornamentation. They are usually located at the centre of the town at which at one stage a market was held. Originally there were one, three, four or even five or more bays on the ground floor which formed a covered arcade to protect traders from the elements and allow access for carts, animals and produce. An upper floor was often used as a court house or ballroom while the cellar or basement was often used as a local gaol. Ornamentation consisted of a cupola, a clock or sometimes a dome or tower. Today most of the market houses in Ireland have been put to use as cultural venues, business premises, town halls or have been left derelict pending development. Many are listed as protected structures while very few have been demolished in recent times due to a newfound architectural, historical and social appreciation.

Table of market house locations

See also
 Architecture of Ireland
 Irish Architectural Archive
 List of towns and villages in Ireland
 Market houses in Northern Ireland
 Tholsel
 Market hall
 Weigh house

References

Further reading
 McParland, Edward (2001) Public Architecture in Ireland 1680–1760 Yale University Press

External links
 National Inventory of Architectural Heritage
 Buildings of Ireland
 Irish Antiquities (with many pictures of market houses)
 Postcards Ireland
 Dúchas
 The Historical Picture Archive
 Patrick Comerford Irish history website
 Library Ireland - A Topographical Dictionary of Ireland (1838) by Samuel Lewis

Retail buildings in the Republic of Ireland
Architecture in the Republic of Ireland
Lists of buildings and structures in the Republic of Ireland
Republic of Ireland